Louisiana wine refers to wine made from grapes grown in the U.S. state of Louisiana. Growing grapes in Louisiana is challenging which has hindered its wine industry. The climate of Louisiana is extremely hot and humid, and viticulturists in the state face Pierce's disease, powdery mildew, and other grapevine diseases. There are four commercial wineries in Louisiana that collectively produce about 20,000 gallons (75,000 liters) of wine per year.

References

 
Wine regions of the United States by state